Sandro Plínio Rosa da Cruz (born 12 May 2001) is a Portuguese professional footballer who plays as a left-back for Chaves on loan from Benfica.

Playing career
On 27 June 2020, Cruz signed a professional contract with Benfica B. He made his professional debut with Benfica B in a 2–0 LigaPro win over Casa Pia on 7 February 2021.

Personal life
Cruz is the son of the Angolan handball player Filipe Cruz. and brother of Stelvio Cruz.(midfielder FC Mondercange)

References

External links
 
 
 

2002 births
Living people
Sportspeople from Braga
Portuguese footballers
Portugal youth international footballers
Portuguese sportspeople of Angolan descent
Association football fullbacks
S.L. Benfica footballers
S.L. Benfica B players
Primeira Liga players
G.D. Chaves players
Liga Portugal 2 players